Kerbisher & Malt is a chain of fish and chip shops in London. The first branch was established in the west London suburb of Brook Green by chef Saul Reuben and his brother-in-law Nick Crossley in 2011.  "Kerbisher" was a fishing boat crewed by Crossley's grandfather, who was a herring fisherman, while "Malt" is the malt vinegar commonly served with fish and chips.

Reception
Zoe Williams reviewed their opening for the Sunday Telegraph, praising the freshness of the fish and the traditional quality of the chips, "I almost want to write a love poem to the chips ... Here, they've returned to first principles ... They've made chips that remind me of being a kid and going to the chip-shop after swimming..."

Company Structure
The chain was owned by CRFC Ltd, a private company limited by shares.

See also
 List of fish and chip restaurants

References

External links 
 

2011 establishments in England
Fish and chip restaurants
Restaurants established in 2011
Restaurants in London
Restaurant chains in the United Kingdom